Fountain N' Lakes is a village in Lincoln County, Missouri, United States. The population was 165 at the 2010 census.

Geography
Fountain N' Lakes is located at  (38.967512, -90.849747).

Demographics

2010 census
As of the census of 2010, there were 165 people, 62 households, and 47 families living in the village. The racial makeup of the village was 95.8% White, 1.8% from other races, and 2.4% from two or more races. Hispanic or Latino of any race were 2.4% of the population.

There were 62 households, of which 35.5% had children under the age of 18 living with them, 53.2% were married couples living together, 14.5% had a female householder with no husband present, 8.1% had a male householder with no wife present, and 24.2% were non-families. 21.0% of all households were made up of individuals, and 3.2% had someone living alone who was 65 years of age or older. The average household size was 2.66 and the average family size was 2.98.

The median age in the village was 40.9 years. 21.8% of residents were under the age of 18; 5.5% were between the ages of 18 and 24; 29.1% were from 25 to 44; 35.2% were from 45 to 64; and 8.5% were 65 years of age or older. The gender makeup of the village was 49.7% male and 50.3% female.

2000 census
As of the census of 2000, there were 129 people, 48 households, and 33 families living in the village. The racial makeup of the village was 99.22% White and 0.78% Native American.

There were 48 households, out of which 31.3% had children under the age of 18 living with them, 50.0% were married couples living together, 8.3% had a female householder with no husband present, and 29.2% were non-families. 16.7% of all households were made up of individuals, and 2.1% had someone living alone who was 65 years of age or older. The average household size was 2.69 and the average family size was 3.00.

In the village, the population was spread out, with 26.4% under the age of 18, 8.5% from 18 to 24, 27.1% from 25 to 44, 27.9% from 45 to 64, and 10.1% who were 65 years of age or older. The median age was 38 years. For every 100 females, there were 115.0 males. For every 100 females age 18 and over, there were 115.9 males.

The median income for a household in the village was $30,313, and the median income for a family was $31,563. Males had a median income of $28,036 versus $23,750 for females. The per capita income for the village was $14,108. There were 17.2% of families and 15.7% of the population living below the poverty line, including 20.7% of under eighteens and 27.3% of those over 64.

References

Villages in Lincoln County, Missouri
Villages in Missouri